The Gordon House is a historic house in Irene, South Dakota. It was built in 1885 with bricks from Yankton. It is the only property with double walls in Irene, and there are hood moulds. It has been listed on the National Register of Historic Places since April 16, 1980.

References

National Register of Historic Places in Yankton County, South Dakota
Houses completed in 1885